Spilomyia wirthi is a species of syrphid fly in the family Syrphidae.

Distribution
Costa Rica.

References

Eristalinae
Insects described in 1996
Diptera of South America
Taxa named by F. Christian Thompson